"Don't Knock My Love" is a hit song performed by R&B singer Wilson Pickett and written by Pickett with Brad Shapiro. Released in the spring of 1971 from the album of the same title, it spent a week at number-one on the Billboard Best Selling Soul Singles Chart and peaked at #13 on the Billboard Hot 100 Singles Chart. The song, which was produced under a funk tempo was Pickett's last number-one single and one of his last hits for Atlantic Records.

Marvin Gaye and Diana Ross version
The best known cover version of this song was recorded by Diana Ross and Marvin Gaye for their 1973 duet album, Diana & Marvin.  It peaked at #46 on the Billboard Hot 100 Singles Chart and #25 on the Hot Soul Singles Chart.  Outrside the US, the duo had a #1 hit in Brazil with their cover.

Personnel

Wilson Pickett version
Lead vocals by Wilson Pickett
Instrumentation by assorted musicians
Produced by Wilson Pickett

Diana Ross and Marvin Gaye version
Lead vocals by Marvin Gaye and Diana Ross
Background vocals by assorted singers
Instrumentation by The Funk Brothers
Produced by Hal Davis

Other Versions
In 1980, Lou Christie and Pia Zadora recorded a version as a non-album single on the Mindsong Music label.
In 1994, Kate Ceberano and Jon Stevens recorded a version for the 1994 album Kate Ceberano and Friends.

References

1971 singles
1974 singles
Wilson Pickett songs
Diana Ross songs
Marvin Gaye songs
Male–female vocal duets
Songs written by Wilson Pickett
Songs written by Brad Shapiro
Song recordings produced by Hal Davis
1971 songs
Motown singles
Atlantic Records singles